Habibi is a surname. People with the surname include:

 Abdul Hai Habibi (1910–1984), Afghan historian and politician
 Abdullah Habibi (fl. 1972–2017), Afghan army general and diplomat
 Alfian Habibi (born 1985), Indonesian footballer
 Emam-Ali Habibi (born 1931), Iranian freestyle wrestler
 Emile Habibi (1922–1996), Palestinian and Israeli Arab writer and politician
 Goudarz Habibi (born 1947), Iranian footballer
 Hamed Habibi (born 1978), Iranian poet and writer
 Hassan Habibi (1937–2013), Iranian politician, lawyer and scholar
 Hassan Habibi (footballer) (born 1939), Iranian football player and manager
 Majid Habibi (born 1981), Iranian voice actor and dub director
 Mohammad-Nabi Habibi (1946–2019), Iranian politician and sociologist
 Nader Habibi, Iranian-American economist
 Natavan Habibi (born 1981), Azerbaijani singer and actress
 Paul Habibi (born before 2004), American real estate entrepreneur and academic
 Shafiqa Habibi (born 1947), Afghan journalist, activist and politician
 Shahla Habibi (1958–2017), Iranian politician

Arabic-language surnames